Turunen is a Finnish surname. Notable people with the surname include:

Antti Turunen, the head of the Finnish Foreign Ministry's Eastern European and Central Asian department
Emilie Turunen (born 1984), as of 2009, the youngest member of the European Parliament
Hannu Turunen (born 1956), former Finnish footballer
Heikki Turunen (born 1945), Finnish author who lives in Joensuu
Juha Turunen (born 1964), Finnish lawyer who confessed to a kidnapping in 2009
 Kari Turunen, Finnish musician
Martti Turunen (born 1940), now known as Marutei Tsurunen, Finnish-born Japanese politician
Miikka Turunen (born 1979), Finnish football player currently playing for KuPS
Miina Turunen (born 1973), Finnish actress
Minna Turunen (born 1969), Finnish actress
Patrik Turunen (born 1988), Finnish football player currently playing for KuPS
Tarja Turunen (born 1977), Finnish singer-songwriter and composer
Teemu Turunen (born 1986), Finnish footballer, who plays as a midfielder
Timo Turunen (born 1948), retired professional ice hockey player who played in the SM-liiga
Tuomo Turunen (born 1987), Finnish footballer

Finnish-language surnames